Ethiopian cuisine ( "Ye-Ītyōṗṗyā məgəb") characteristically consists of vegetable and often very spicy meat dishes.

The Ethiopian Orthodox Tewahedo Church prescribes a number of fasting periods known as tsom ( ṣōm),  including all Wednesdays and Fridays and the whole Lenten season (including fifteen days outside Lent proper). Per Oriental Orthodox tradition, the faithful may not consume any kind of animal products (including dairy products and eggs) during fasts; Ethiopian cuisine therefore contains many dishes that are vegan.

Overview

A typical dish consists of  accompanied by a spicy stew, which frequently includes beef, lamb, vegetables and various types of legumes, such as lentils. The cuisines of the Southern Nations, Nationalities and People's Region and the Sidama region also make use of the false banana plant (Ge'ez: እንሰት ïnset), a type of ensete. The plant is pulverized and fermented to make various foods, including a bread-like food called kocho (Ge'ez: ቆጮ ḳōč̣ō), which is eaten with kitfo. The root of this plant may be powdered and prepared as a hot drink called bulla (Ge'ez: ቡላ būlā), which is often given to those who are tired or ill. Another typical Gurage preparation is coffee with butter (kebbeh). Kita herb bread is also baked.

Due in part to the brief Italian occupation, pasta is popular and frequently available throughout Ethiopia, including rural areas. Coffee is also a large part of Ethiopian culture and cuisine. After every meal, a coffee ceremony is enacted and coffee is served.

Restrictions of certain meats
Ethiopian Orthodox Christians, Ethiopian Jews and Ethiopian Muslims avoid eating pork or shellfish, for religious reasons. Pork is considered unclean in Ethiopian Orthodox Christianity, Judaism and Islam. Many Ethiopians abstain from eating certain meats, and mostly eat vegetarian and vegan foods.

Traditional ingredients

Berbere, a combination of powdered chili pepper and other spices (cardamom, fenugreek, coriander, cloves, ginger, nutmeg, cumin and allspice) is an important ingredient used  to add flavor to many varied dishes like chicken stews and baked fish dishes. Also essential is niter kibbeh, a clarified butter infused with ginger, garlic, and several spices.

Mitmita is a powdered seasoning mix used in Ethiopian cuisine. It is orange-red in color and contains ground birdseye chili peppers (piri piri), cardamom seed, cloves and salt. It occasionally has other spices including cinnamon, cumin and ginger.

In their adherence to strict fasting, Ethiopian cooks have developed a rich array of cooking oil sources—besides sesame and safflower—for use as a substitute for animal fats which are forbidden during fasting periods. Ethiopian cuisine also uses nug (also spelled noog, also known as "niger seed").

Dishes

Wat

Wat begins with a large amount of chopped red onion, which is simmered or sauteed in a pot. Once the onions have softened, niter kebbeh (or, in the case of vegan dishes, vegetable oil) is added. Following this, berbere is added to make a spicy keiy wat or keyyih tsebhi. Turmeric is used instead of berbere for a milder alicha wat or both spices are omitted when making vegetable stews, such as atkilt wat. Meat such as beef (ሥጋ, səga), chicken (ዶሮ, doro or derho), fish (ዓሣ, asa), goat or lamb (በግ, beg or beggi) is also added. Legumes such as split peas (ክክ, kək  or kikki) and lentils (ምስር, məsər or birsin); or vegetables such as potatoes (ድንች, Dənəch), carrots and chard (ቆስጣ) are also used instead in vegan dishes.

Each variation is named by appending the main ingredient to the type of wat (e.g. ). However, the word keiy is usually not necessary, as the spicy variety is assumed when it is omitted (e.g. doro wat).

Tibs

Meat along with vegetables are sautéed to make tibs (also tebs, t'ibs, tibbs, etc., Ge'ez: ጥብስ ṭïbs). Tibs is served in a variety of manners, and can range from hot to mild or contain little to no vegetables. There are many variations of the delicacy, depending on type, size or shape of the cuts of meat used. Beef, mutton, and goat are the most common meats used in the preparation of tibs.
 
The mid-18th-century European visitor to Ethiopia  describes tibs as a portion of grilled meat served "to pay a particular compliment or show especial respect to someone." It may still be seen this way; today the dish is prepared to commemorate special events and holidays.

Kinche (Qinch'e)

Kinche (Qinch’e), a porridge, is a very common Ethiopian breakfast or supper.  It is incredibly simple, inexpensive, and nutritious.  It is made from cracked wheat, Ethiopian oats, barley or a mixture of those. It can be boiled in either milk or water with a little salt. The flavor of kinche comes from the nit'ir qibe, which is a spiced butter.

Oromo dishes

The Oromos' cuisine consists of various vegetable or meat side dishes and entrées. as part of a long-established custom, practice, or belief;  People do not eat pork in Oromia.

Foon Waaddii – minced roasted meat; specially seasoned
Anchotte – a common dish in the western part of Oromia
Baduu – liquid remaining after milk has been curdled and strained (cheese)
Maarqaa – porridge like substance made from wheat, milk, chili and spices
Chechebsaa – shredded biddena stir-fried with chili powder and cheese
Qoocco – also known as kocho, it is not the Gurage type of kocho but a different kind; a common dish in the western part of Oromia 
Itto –  comprises all sorts of vegetables (tomato, potato, ginger, garlic), meat (lamb)
chukkoo – also known as Micira; a sweet flavor of whole grain, seasoned with butter and spices
Chororsaa – a common dish in the western part of Oromia
 Hulbata- slow cooked thick stew, made up of organic fenugreek seed powder, potato, lamb rib or loin chops seasoned with chili, garlic and tomato spices served on top of Biddena; mostly cooked in East Hararghe Zone and West Hararghe Zone of Oromia
Dokkee – a common dish throughout Oromia state
Qince – similar to Marqaa but made from shredded grains as opposed to flour
Qorso (Akayi) – as snacks Oromia state
Dadhii –  a drink made from honey
Hanida/Haneed– slow-roasted lamb dish usually served with rice
Shitney/Shatta sauce– a mixture of herbs and peppers used as a side for hanida
Farsho – Beer like, made from barley
Buna –  a lot of Coffee

Gurage dishes

Kitfo

Another distinctively Ethiopian dish is kitfo (frequently spelled ketfo).

Ayibe
 is a local cheese that is mild and crumbly, close in texture to crumbled feta. Although not quite pressed, the whey has been drained and squeezed out. It is often served as a side dish to soften the effect of very spicy food. It has little to no distinct taste of its own. However, when served separately,  is often mixed with a variety of mild or hot spices typical of Gurage cuisine.

Gomen kitfo
Gomen kitfo is another typical Gurage dish. Collard greens (ጎመን gōmen) are boiled, dried and then finely chopped and served with butter, chili and spices. It is a dish specially prepared for the occasion of Meskel, a very popular holiday marking the discovery of the True Cross.

Sidama dishes

Wassa
The enset plant (called wesse in the Sidamo language) is central to Sidama cuisine and after grinding and fermenting the root to produce wassa, it is used in the preparation of several foods.

Borasaame is a cooked mixture of wassa and butter sometimes eaten with Ethiopian mustard greens and/or beans. It is traditionally eaten by hand using a false banana leaf and is served in a ', a vase-like ceramic vessel. A common variant of borasaame uses maize flour instead of wassa and is called badela borasaame.
Borasaame is typically paired with a seasoned yogurt drink called wätät. Both are common foods for funerals and the celebration of Fichee Chambalaalla, the Sidama new year.

Gomen ba siga

Maize
A commonly grown crop in Sidama, maize (badela in Sidaamu; also known as "corn" in North America) is often eaten as a snack with coffee. It can be ground into flour to make bread, roasted on the cob, or the kernels can be picked off to make bokolo, which is served either boiled or roasted.

Breakfast

Fit-fit or fir-fir is a common breakfast dish. It is made from shredded  or kitcha stir-fried with spices or wat. The delicacy consists of a large fried pancake made with flour, often with a layer of egg. It is eaten with honey.

Chechebsa (or kita firfir) resembles a pancake covered with berbere and niter kibbeh, or other spices, and may be eaten with a spoon. Genfo is a kind of porridge, which is another common breakfast dish. It is usually served in a large bowl with a dug-out made in the middle of the genfo and filled with spiced niter kibbeh.

Snacks
Typical Ethiopian snacks are dabo kolo (small pieces of baked bread that are similar to pretzels), or kolo (roasted barley sometimes mixed with other local grains). Kolo made from roasted and spiced barley, safflower kernels, chickpeas and/or peanuts are often sold by kiosks and street vendors, wrapped in a paper cone. Snacking on popcorn and traditional lentil samosa is also common.

Beverages

Traditional alcoholic beverages 
There are many different traditional alcoholic drinks which are home made and of natural ingredients.

Tella
Tella is a home-brewed beer served in tella bet ("tella houses") which specialize in serving only tella. Tella is the most common beverage made and served in households during holidays.

It is an alcoholic drink which is prepared from bikil (barley) as main ingredient and gesho (Rhamnus prinoides) for fermentation purpose.

In Oromiffaa the drink is called farso and in Tigrinya siwa.

Tej (honey wine) 
Tej is a potent honey wine. It is similar to mead, and is frequently served in bars, particularly in a tej bet or "tej house".

It is prepared from honey and gesho. It has a sweet taste and the alcoholic content is relatively higher than tella. This drink can be stored for a long time; the longer it is stored, the higher the alcohol content, and the stronger the taste.

Areki (katikala)
Areki, also known as katikala, is probably the strongest alcoholic drink of Ethiopia. It is a home distilled spirit that is often filtered through charcoal to remove off tastes or flavored by smoking or infusion with garlic.

Non-alcoholic beverages 
Ethiopians have diverse traditional non-alcoholic drinks which include natural and healthy ingredients.

Kenetto (keribo)
Kenetto, also known as keribo, is a non-alcoholic traditional drink. It is mostly used as substitute for tella for those who don't drink alcohol.

Borde
Borde is a cereal-based traditional fermented beverage famous in southern Ethiopia.

Manufactured drinks
Just like the rest of the world, Ethiopians also enjoy several locally manufactured beers, wine and non-alcoholic products like Coca-Cola and other similar products.
Ambo Mineral Water or Ambo wuha is a bottled carbonated mineral water, sourced from the springs in Ambo Senkele near the town of Ambo.

Non-alcoholic brews (hot drinks)

Atmet 
Atmet is a barley- and oat-flour based drink that is cooked with water, sugar and kibe (Ethiopian clarified butter) until the ingredients have combined to create a consistency slightly thicker than egg-nog. Though this drink is often given to women who are nursing, the sweetness and smooth texture make it a comfort drink for anyone who enjoys its flavor.

Coffee

According to some sources, drinking of coffee (buna) is likely to have originated in Ethiopia. A key national beverage, it is an important part of local commerce.

The coffee ceremony is the traditional serving of coffee, usually after a big meal. It often involves the use of a jebena (ጀበና), a clay coffee pot in which the coffee is boiled. The preparer roasts the coffee beans in front of guests, then walks around wafting the smoke throughout the room so participants may sample the scent of coffee. The coffee is put into the jebena, boiled with water, and then served in small cups called si'ni. Coffee is usually served with sugar, but is also served with salt in many parts of Ethiopia. In some parts of the country, niter kibbeh is added instead of sugar or salt.

Snacks, such as popcorn or toasted barley (or kolo), are often served with the coffee. In most homes, a dedicated coffee area is surrounded by fresh grass, with special furniture for the coffee maker. A complete ceremony has three rounds of coffee (abol, tona and bereka) and is accompanied by the burning of frankincense.

Tea (chai)
Tea will most likely be served if coffee is declined. Tea is grown in Ethiopia at Gumaro and Wushwush.

Boiled coffee leaves
Across southern Ethiopia, many groups drink boiled coffee leaves, called kuti among the Harari in the east and kaari among the Majang in the west. This is often made with widely varying seasonings and spices, such as sugar, salt, rue, hot peppers,  ginger. The Ethiopian Food Safety Authority has registered the safety of coffee leaf infusions with the European Union.

See also
 List of African cuisines
 Ethiopian Jewish cuisine

References

External links

 Mesob Across America: Ethiopian Food in the U.S.A. A book about the history and culture of Ethiopian cuisine
 Ethiopian Restaurant Guide A guide to Ethiopian restaurants in the USA. Includes video visits to some restaurants
 All About Tej An extensive website about the Ethiopian honey wine
Raw Meat, a Manly Ethiopian Dish The Los Angeles Times, 14 July 2011
 Ethiopian Spices  by Fassica - Authentic Ethiopian Food and Spices

 
East African cuisine